Charles James Spencer-Churchill, 12th Duke of Marlborough (born 24 November 1955), styled Earl of Sunderland until March 1972 and Marquess of Blandford until October 2014, and often known as Jamie Blandford or Jamie Marlborough, is an English peer and the current Duke of Marlborough.

He is the eldest surviving son of the 11th Duke of Marlborough and his first wife, Susan Mary Hornby. As a member of the Spencer family, he is a distant relative of the war-time Conservative Prime Minister Sir Winston Churchill and of Diana, Princess of Wales, born Lady Diana Spencer. He is also a stepbrother of the late Christina Onassis, who was the stepdaughter of Jacqueline Kennedy Onassis, who was once married to U.S. President John F. Kennedy, by the second marriage of his father with Athina Livanos.  He is also a descendant of the prominent American Vanderbilt family through his great-grandmother Consuelo Vanderbilt.

Biography

Born in Oxford, he was educated at Harrow School and the Royal Agricultural College. In a bid to safeguard the Blenheim Palace estate from the then Marquess's excessive behaviour, his father won a court battle in 1994 to ensure he never won control of the family seat, but their relationship may have improved later.

In 1995, he spent a month in prison for forging prescriptions. In September 2007, he was sentenced to six months in jail on two counts of dangerous driving and one of criminal damage following a "road rage" attack on another motorist's car. At the same time, he was banned from driving for three and a half years. In 2013, he was accused by a Sikh cab driver of abusing the driver with racist language.

In 2021, having ascended to the dukedom of Marlborough, he successfully stood for election to Woodstock Town Council.

Inheritance
On the death of his father in 2014, the Oxford Mail noted the new duke's "well-publicised drug addiction" and reported that a spokesman for Blenheim Palace had said "the Palace will remain under the control of trustees", but that the 12th Duke could himself become one of the trustees. The Daily Telegraph reported that "The responsibility of maintaining one of Britain's grandest country houses for future generations now passes to 58-year-old Jamie Blandford, as he is commonly known, following a remarkable turnaround in his relationship with his late father, who once described him as the 'black sheep' of his family."

Television appearance
On 24 June 2009, he appeared in a BBC Television documentary, Famous, Rich and Homeless, in which famous people were filmed spending three nights in the open with nothing but a sleeping bag, though he refused to "sleep rough". He claimed that on the first night he slept in the car park of a five-star hotel, though his sleeping bag was discovered unopened, and on the second night he demanded to be housed in a hotel. He refused to participate further despite giving an assurance that he would sleep rough on the third night, and ended his participation on that night. Another participant, Hardeep Singh Kohli, said that Blandford's behaviour was "disrespectful to all the people out there".

Marriages and issue
His first wife was Rebecca Mary Few Brown (born September 1957, Bangor, Wales). They were married on 24 February 1990 at the Church of St Mary Magdalene, Woodstock. Their marriage ended in divorce in 1998. They had one son, who is now heir apparent to the Dukedom of Marlborough:

 George John Godolphin Spencer-Churchill, Marquess of Blandford (born 28 July 1992), who went by the courtesy title Earl of Sunderland until his father's accession to the dukedom in 2014. 

His second wife is Edla Griffiths (born 1968, Abergavenny, Wales), whom he married at Woodstock Register Office on 1 March 2002. They have two children:

 Lady Araminta Clementine Megan Spencer-Churchill (born 8 April 2007)
 Lord Caspar Sasha Ivor Spencer-Churchill (born 18 October 2008)

Lord Caspar Spencer-Churchill is second in the line of succession to the Dukedom of Marlborough.

Arms

References

 

21st-century English criminals
1955 births
Alumni of the Royal Agricultural University
Marlborough, James Spencer-Churchill, 12th Duke
112
Living people
People educated at Harrow School
James Spencer-Churchill, 12th Duke
James Spencer-Churchill, 12th Duke